Weyerhaeuser is one of the world's largest private owners of timberlands.

Weyerhaeuser may also refer to:

Companies
 Weyerhaeuser Real Estate Company, based in Federal Way, Washington
 Weyerhaeuser Mortgage Company, based in Woodland Hills, California
 Weyerhaeuser Steamship Company, based in Tacoma, Washington

People
 Friedrich Weyerhäuser (1834–1914), German–American timber mogul and founder of Weyerhaeuser
 George Weyerhaeuser kidnapping, the 1935 abduction of a great-grandson of Friedrich Weyerhäuser

Places
 Weyerhaeuser, Wisconsin, a village in the United States
 Weyerhaeuser Glacier, in Antarctica

Structures
 Charles A. Weyerhaeuser and Musser Houses, in Little Falls, Minnesota
 Weyerhaeuser Arena, in Port Alberni, British Columbia
 Weyerhaeuser House, in Rock Island, Illinois
 Weyerhaeuser King County Aquatic Center,  in Federal Way, Washington
 Weyerhaeuser Office Building, in Everett, Washington

See also